The 1964 United States Senate election in Massachusetts was held on November 3, 1964, with the incumbent Democratic senator, Ted Kennedy, easily defeating his Republican challenger Howard J. Whitmore Jr.

The election coincided with the 1964 United States presidential election, which was won by incumbent Democrat Lyndon B. Johnson in a landslide, as well as the Senate election in neighboring New York which was won by Kennedy's older brother Robert. It took place less than a year after the assassination of the incumbent Senator's eldest surviving brother, President John F. Kennedy. The two surviving Kennedy brothers thus benefited from both an overall national swing to the Democrats and public sympathy following their sibling's murder. Much of the campaign-appearance burden in Massachusetts on behalf of Ted Kennedy fell on his wife, Joan, because of Ted's serious back injury in a plane crash.

Ted Kennedy recorded his highest-ever percentage of the vote in this election, although he won a larger margin of victory against divided opposition in 2000.

Democratic primary

Candidates
 Ted Kennedy, incumbent Senator since 1962

Results
Senator Kennedy was unopposed for renomination.

Republican primary

Candidates
 Howard J. Whitmore Jr., former State Representative and mayor of Newton

Results
Whitmore was unopposed for the Republican nomination.

General election

Candidates
 Lawrence Gilfedder, perennial candidate (Socialist Workers)
 Ted Kennedy, incumbent Senator since 1962 (Democratic)
 Grace F. Luder, candidate for Congress in 1950 and 1952 (Prohibition)
 Howard J. Whitmore Jr., former State Representative and mayor of Newton (Republican)

Results

See also 
 United States Senate elections, 1964

External links
 Race details at ourcampaigns.com

References
Notes

Sources
 Campaigning from a Hospital Bed Recordings of Telephone Calls between Edward Kennedy and President Lyndon Johnson during the 1964 campaign

Mas
1964
1964 Massachusetts elections